Hassan Ali Maatouk (born 10 August 1987) is a Lebanese professional footballer who plays as a forward for  club Ansar and captains the Lebanon national team. Known for his pace and technical skills, Maatouk is Lebanon's all-time top goalscorer and most-capped player; he became a key part of the national team as their captain since 2016.

Maatouk began his senior career at age 17 in 2005 at Ahed in Lebanon. He won a total of 11 trophies with his team, including three Lebanese Premier League titles and three Lebanese FA Cups in his seven-year stay. Maatouk moved to the United Arab Emirates (UAE) in 2011 on a one-year loan to Ajman; after a short spell at Emirates, he signed for Al-Shaab. In 2013, he transferred to Fujairah, where he remained for four seasons scoring 56 goals for the team and becoming their all-time top goalscorer. In 2017, Maatouk returned to his home country signing with Nejmeh: he won two Lebanese Elite Cups, and was named Best Player of the league in both seasons at the club. In 2019 he joined cross-city rivals Ansar on a free transfer, helping them win their first league title in 14 years in 2021 as the league top scorer.

In 2006, Maatouk debuted with the national team, in a match against Saudi Arabia; his first goal came in 2011 against Bangladesh. In 2016, he succeeded Roda Antar as captain of the team. With five goals in six matches in the third round of qualification for the 2019 Asian Cup, Maatouk helped an unbeaten Lebanon qualify for their first Asian Cup through qualification. As of November 2022, Maatouk has scored 21 goals in 100 games, becoming his country's all-time top goalscorer and most-capped player. He also became the first player to reach 100 international caps for his nation in 2022.

During his stint at Ahed, Maatouk was nominated Best Player of the Lebanese Premier League in 2010 and 2011, an accomplishment which he won twice more with Nejmeh in 2018 and 2019. Maatouk was also included in the Team of the Year in those four years. With Fujairah in the UAE, Maatouk scored 56 goals in 110 games, becoming the club's all-time top goalscorer. He also won the Lebanese Premier League Golden Boot twice, in 2011 and 2021.

Early life 

Born in Sir el Gharbieh, Lebanon on 10 August 1987, Maatouk and his family fled to Germany in 1989 because of the Lebanese Civil War. He first started playing football in Germany, playing for Rot-Weiss Essen's youth team. Maatouk cited his experience in Europe as essential to his development. He returned to Lebanon in 1998, and later signed with Ahed's youth team.

Club career

Ahed

2004–05: Debut season
Coming through the youth system, Maatouk's senior career began at age 17 with Ahed in the Lebanese Premier League. His first league goal for Ahed came on 20 March 2005 against Rayyan when he scored the match winner in a 2–1 win. His first domestic brace came two months later on Matchday 19, when he scored the only two goals in a match against Tadamon Sour. Maatouk scored three goals in the 2005 AFC Cup, two of which were against Al-Hussein of Jordan on 25 May. He ended his 2004–05 season with three league goals, as well as helping his side win the Lebanese FA Cup after defeating Olympic Beirut 2–1 in the final.

2005–2009: First league title and domestic treble
On 5 February 2006, during the 2005–06 Lebanese Premier League season, Maatouk scored his first domestic hat-trick against Salam Zgharta in an 8–0 win. He scored a total of eight goals in the league, improving on his previous tally. His 2006–07 Lebanese Premier League season, however, was not as prolific. He scored only three league goals and two cup goals.

Maatouk began the 2007–08 season with a hat-trick against Tripoli on Matchday 5, in a match that ended 7–1. 2010 Thanks to four other goals scored throughout the season, Maatouk helped Ahed win their first-ever Lebanese League title.

Maatouk was the top scorer of the 2008 Lebanese Elite Cup with three goals, on a par with his teammate Salih Sadir. He scored in both of the 2009 AFC Cup group stage games against Busaiteen, but his team failed to qualify to the next round. He won a domestic treble with Ahed during the 2008–09 season, winning the Lebanese FA Cup, the Elite Cup, and the Super Cup.

2009–2011: Consecutive league Best Player awards and top scorer
On 30 January 2010, he scored a brace in the quarter-finals of the FA Cup against Nejmeh, despite his side being a man down. This secured the team's entry into the semifinals, which they lost to Ansar 3–1. Three months later, on 7 April, Maatouk scored his first brace in the AFC Cup against Al-Jaish as a substitute from the 46th minute; his side lost 6–3. Following up on his previous season's success, Maatouk scored 12 goals in the league; his second win. He was also awarded the Lebanese Premier League Best Player award.

In his final season with Ahed, Maatouk scored 15 league goals to become the season's top goalscorer. He also won a domestic quadruple with his team, winning the league, the FA Cup, the Elite Cup, and the Super Cup. Thanks to his performances he won a second Best Player award. Maatouk scored 53 league goals in six years with the Lebanese side, and won a total of 11 trophies for his team.

Ajman

2011–12: First season in the UAE Pro League
On 27 September 2011, it was announced that Maatouk had completed a loan deal to UAE Pro League side Ajman worth $180,000. He later said in an interview that during a match played for the Lebanon national team, against the United Arab Emirates on 6 September 2011, Ajman's coach was present and showed interest in signing him.

During the 2011–12 season he scored six goals for his club, as well as a brace on his debut, on 10 October 2011, in a UAE League Cup match against Al-Nasr. His first league goal, however, came on 3 December of the same year, against Dubai in a 3–1 away win. On 4 January 2012, Maatouk's first UAE Pro League brace came against Sharjah in a 1–3 win, when he scored in the first minutes of both halves.

In 2012 his performances attracted the attention of various European teams, such as Borussia Dortmund in Germany, and Ligue 1 sides Olympique Marseille, Ajaccio, and Nice.

Emirates and Al-Shaab

2012–13: Second season in the UAE Pro League 
On 18 June 2012, it was announced that Maatouk had signed a one-year deal with Emirates Club for $800,000. His former club Ajman had been unable to pay the fee that Ahed asked to renew the loan deal. He played one game in the promotion/relegation play-offs, in a 2–1 defeat to Sharjah on 14 September. As Emirates Club finished in last place in the play-off group, they were relegated to the UAE First Division.

Maatouk moved to Al-Shaab on 27 September on a three-year deal for an undisclosed fee. He scored four league goals for the team during the 2012–13 season. He also scored two League Cup goals, one of which was against Al-Nasr on 16 January 2013, Maatouk's third against them in the competition.

Fujairah

2013–2016: Promotion and stay in the UAE Pro League 
In 2013 Maatouk moved on a free transfer to UAE First Division side Fujairah. In his debut season he scored 20 league goals in 23 games, helping his side gain promotion for the first time in their history to the UAE Pro League for the following season.

His first Pro League goal for the team, which also happened to be a brace, came on 4 February 2015 against Emirates in a 1–2 win. His next league goal for Fujairah came in the form of a double against Al-Ittihald Kalba on 21 March 2015, with his 89th-minute goal being the match decider in a 2–3 away win. He scored a total of five goals in 26 appearances in the league. Maatouk was included in the 13-man shortlist for the 2014–15 UAE Pro League Best Foreign Player award.

During his second season with Fujairah in the UAE Pro League, Maatouk improved his goal tally by scoring nine goals in the same number of appearances as the previous season. He also scored one League Cup goal in two matches. This was not enough to keep the team safe, however, and they were relegated back to the second division after only two seasons.

2016–17: Relegation back to the First Division
In his last season for the club, played in the UAE First Division, Maatouk scored 12 goals in 16 appearances. He was released by Fujairah on 11 July 2017, despite having a year remaining on his contract. The Lebanese player's desire to terminate his contract came after his team failed to gain promotion to the first division during the 2016–17 season. Maatouk said that the appointment of Diego Maradona as coach was not tempting enough for him to remain, and he would rather depart from the Division One side. He scored a total of 46 goals in 91 league appearances, as well as 10 cup goals in 19 appearances for his club, leaving as Fujairah's all-time top goalscorer with 56 total goals.

Nejmeh

2017–18: Fourth Elite Cup and third Best Player award
Maatouk decided to return to Lebanon in 2017, signing for Nejmeh. Less than a month after signing, he helped the side win the 2017 Lebanese Elite Cup, winning on penalties against his former club Ahed in the final played on 20 August. On his league debut, played on 15 September, Maatouk faced Ahed once again in a 2–2 draw, scoring in the 22nd minute from the penalty spot. His first brace for Nejmeh came two months later, on 5 November, against Tadamon Sour in a 2–0 away win.

Upon his return to the Lebanese Premier League, he scored 13 goals and made 14 assists in 21 league appearances, making him the second-highest scorer and the player with the most assists in the 2017–18 season. He won the Lebanese Premier League Best Player award for the third time, and was included in the Lebanese Premier League Team of the Season for his performances.

2018–19: Fifth Elite Cup and fourth Best Player award
At the 2018–19 Arab Club Champions Cup play-off rounds Maatouk scored twice in three matches, one goal being a penalty in a 1–0 win against Tunisian team Club Africain on 23 May 2018. This enabled Nejmeh to gain all three points and qualify to the Round of 36 against Al Ahly, where his team lost 4–1 on aggregate and was subsequently knocked out of the competition. On 2 July 2018, amidst speculation of his departure, Nejmeh confirmed Maatouk would remain with the club for the following season. On 25 August 2018, Maatouk won his second consecutive Elite Cup for Nejmeh, his fifth in total, after beating Akhaa Ahli Aley 1–0 in the final.

His first league goal of the 2018–19 season came against Salam Zgharta on 21 October 2018, when he scored the first goal in a 2–0 win. On 12 February, Maatouk was involved with each goal in a 5–1 win against Tripoli, scoring a brace and assisting the other three goals. He was voted the best player of Matchday 14 for his performances. On 6 April 2019, Maatouk's penalty kick allowed his team to beat Ansar 1–0 in the Beirut derby, in a vital fight for second place. Maatouk's first AFC Cup goal for Nejmeh came on 3 May 2019, in a 2–1 away defeat against Hilal Al-Quds. On 14 May he scored his second goal in the 2019 AFC Cup, in a 2–2 draw against Al-Jaish.

Maatouk ended his season with 14 goals in 37 games throughout the campaign. He also made seven assists in the league, making him the player with the second most assists in the season. For his performances, Maatouk won the Lebanese Premier League Best Player award for the fourth time and was included in the Lebanese Premier League Team of the Season.

Ansar

2019–20: Elite Cup finalist and COVID-19 suspension 

On 3 July 2019, cross-city rivals Ansar announced the signing of Maatouk on a three-year deal after his previous contract with Nejmeh had lapsed. His wage of $900,000, distributed over the three years, was the highest player salary in Lebanese football history. Maatouk's first goal for Ansar came on 24 July 2019, in the 2019 Lebanese Elite Cup group stage game against his former club Nejmeh. He scored in the 44th minute in a 3–1 victory, helping his side qualify for the knock-out stages of the competition. In the semi-finals, held on 18 August 2019, Maatouk scored his first brace for his new club in a 5–0 win over Chabab Ghazieh. On 25 August 2019, he scored in the final against Shabab Sahel becoming the tournament's top goalscorer with four goals. However, as his team lost on penalty shoot-outs after drawing 3–3 after extra time, Maatouk failed to secure his first cup with his new club.

Maatouk's league debut for his new club came on 20 September 2019, in the Beirut derby against his former club Nejmeh. His side lost 1–0 because of a 90th minute penalty by Feiz Shamsin. His first league goal came on 29 September 2019, scoring a penalty in a 3–1 home win against Shabab Sahel. On 21 January 2020, the Lebanese Football Association decided to suspend the league. On 24 February 2020, Maatouk scored a header against Al-Faisaly in a 2020 AFC Cup group stage game to help Ansar win 4–3 at home.

2020–21: Domestic double and league top scorer 

On 10 October 2020, Maatouk scored his first league goal of the 2020–21 season in the second matchday, in a 2–0 win over Shabab Bourj. The following game, on 18 October, Maatouk scored a brace against Chabab Ghazieh—including a direct corner kick goal aided by the strong wind—to help Ansar reach the top of the table. In the fourth matchday, played one week later, Maatouk scored another brace, beating his former club Ahed 3–1. On 6 November, Maatouk was involved in four of Ansar's six goals—scoring a goal and assisting three—in a 6–1 league win against Safa. Maatouk scored a hat-trick of penalties on 26 December, helping Ansar win 3–0 against Bourj and temporarily regain the lead in the league. His hat-trick was his first in the league since 2010, when he scored three goals for Ahed against Nejmeh.

After finishing in first place in the league, above Nejmeh in second place, and winning the FA Cup final on penalty shoot-outs, also against Nejmeh, Maatouk helped Ansar win the domestic double. With 14 goals and seven assists in 16 games, Maatouk was the league top goalscorer and top assist provider. He also made three assists in four games in the FA Cup. Ansar's league title was their first since 2007, and their 14th overall.

2021–present: Shoulder injury 
Due to injuries to his shoulder throughout the 2021–22 season, Maatouk was absent from Ansar's matches for several months. He played 11 league games, without scoring a single goal for the first time in his career, and scored three goals in as many FA Cup games, via a hat-trick in a 6–0 win against Salam Zgharta on 22 December 2021. On 14 May 2022, Maatouk renewed his contract with Ansar for two further years.

He ended his 16-month goalscoring draught in the league in the first matchday of the 2022–23 season, with a goal in a 2–2 draw against Shabab Sahel on 3 September 2022. He had scored his previous league goal on 18 April 2021, also against Sahel.

International career

2006–2011: Youth and early career 
Maatouk was called up for the Lebanon national under-23 team at the 2008 Olympics qualifiers in 2007. He scored one goal in five appearances in the second round, helping Lebanon finish second in their group and qualify to the third round. In the final qualification round, Maatouk scored one goal in six matches, finishing in last place in the group.

His senior career had already begun on 26 January 2006, with a friendly match against Saudi Arabia, won by Lebanon 2–1. Between 2009 and 2010, Maatouk participated in the 2011 AFC Asian Cup qualifiers; he played five of Lebanon's six games. The team finished in last place. Maatouk's first goal came in 2011 at the 2014 FIFA World Cup qualifiers, during the first leg of the second round game against Bangladesh; he scored the opener in a match that finished 4–0. Lebanon progressed to the third round, played between 2011 and 2012, where they were drawn with South Korea, Kuwait, and the United Arab Emirates. Maatouk scored his first international brace against Kuwait on 11 October 2011, in a 2–2 draw. In an interview in 2020, Maatouk described his second goal of the match as the most beautiful goal he had scored in his career.

2012–2015: Establishment 

With three goals in five games in the third round, Maatouk helped Lebanon progress to the fourth (and final) round of the 2014 FIFA World Cup qualification for the first time in their history. Lebanon were drawn in Group A with Iran, South Korea, Uzbekistan, and Qatar. Maatouk played all eight games between 2012 and 2013, scoring a goal against South Korea in a 1–1 draw. With five points in eight games, Lebanon finished last in the group, failing to reach the finals.

Maatouk also participated in the 2015 AFC Asian Cup qualifiers between 2013 and 2014, playing all six group stage games. His three goals came against Thailand, including two in the final group stage match, on 5 March 2014, which ended with a 5–2 win for Lebanon. Lebanon finished in third place in their group, failing to qualify to the final tournament.

On 8 September 2014, Maatouk played against the Brazilian Olympic team in an unofficial friendly that ended in a 2–2 draw. In the last minute of the first half, trailing by one goal, he set up Mohamad Ghaddar who scored the equalizer. In the 53rd minute, Maatouk scored a low-driven shot on a volley from a free kick taken by Abbas Ahmed Atwi to put his team in the lead. Ghaddar reciprocated the previous favour 28 minutes later, as he assisted Maatouk with a backheel pass. Maatouk scored after dribbling past the goalkeeper, but the goal was incorrectly ruled offside.

2015–present: Captain and record-breaker 

In the second round of the 2018 FIFA World Cup qualifiers, held between 2015 and 2016, Lebanon drew with South Korea, Kuwait, Myanmar, and Laos. Maatouk scored twice in the second round, against Myanmar and Laos, and, despite finishing second in their group, Lebanon were eliminated from the World Cup. However, their second-place finish enabled them to progress to the final round of qualification for the 2019 AFC Asian Cup.

After the second round of the World Cup qualifiers, national team captain Roda Antar retired from international football, with Maatouk taking over the reigns. Maatouk was fundamental to his team's success during the 2019 AFC Asian Cup qualifications, played between 2017 and 2018: he scored five goals in six matches in the third round, thus qualifying Lebanon to their first ever AFC Asian Cup through qualification.

In December 2018, he was called up for the 2019 AFC Asian Cup as Lebanon's captain. In the first group stage match, on 9 January 2019 against Qatar, Maatouk received a yellow card for "handball", protecting his face with his arm; the opposing team scored from the subsequent free kick. On 17 January, in the third match, Maatouk converted a penalty kick against North Korea, giving Lebanon a 3–1 lead, with the match eventually ending 4–1. However, Lebanon lost out to Vietnam in the third-place ranking on the fair play rule and were knocked out of the competition.

On 19 November 2022, in a friendly against Kuwait in Dubai, United Arab Emirates, Maatouk played his 100th game for Lebanon, becoming the first player in his country to reach 100 international caps.

Style of play
Dubbed the "Lebanese Messi" by some, Maatouk is capable of playing in different positions in attack. Indeed, while initially starting as a centre-forward, he matured into a winger later on in his career. Not only is Maatouk a goal poacher, but he is also able to make the most of his natural abilities, mainly his pace and dribbling. He is known for his great vision and ability on the ball to create scoring opportunities for his teammates. The fact that he can also use both feet equally makes him a very versatile player. Maatouk is also a free kick specialist. While traditionally a left winger, during the 2020–21 season Maatouk was deployed as an inside-forward on the right, cutting inside to create attacking chances.

Theo Bücker, the Lebanon national team's former coach, portrayed Maatouk as the kind of player who "comes around every 10 years" and "is almost impossible to substitute", while his former manager at Ajman, Abdul Wahab Abdul Qadir, noted how Maatouk "is very fast, beats many players and works very hard in the game". Diego Maradona also called him an "outstanding" player. On 22 August 2018, Miodrag Radulović, Lebanon's coach during the 2019 AFC Asian Cup, characterized Maatouk as a "leader" and "a really good player", as well as "one of the very best players in the Middle East" and "right at the top level", comparing him to the likes of "Stevan Jovetić, Mirko Vučinić and Stefan Savić".

Personal life
Maatouk and his wife, Sahar, have four children: a son, a daughter, and a pair of boy twins. He has described his father, Ali, as an inspiration who encouraged him to study and practice football with the same fervor. Maatouk considers Brazilian player Ronaldo the best of all time, and Barcelona is his favourite club.

In a 2020 interview, Maatouk said that the best period of his football career was at Fujairah; the worst was his second season at Nejmeh. His most influential coach at the club level was Džemal Hadžiabdić at Fujairah, and  he cited Miodrag Radulović at the national-team level. According to Maatouk, Lebanon's best players of all time were Youssef Mohamad and Roda Antar. He considered his goal for the Lebanon national team against Kuwait, on 10 October 2011, the most beautiful goal of his career.

Produced by Fulwell 73, FIFA released Captains in 2022, an eight-part sports docuseries following six national team captains in their respective 2022 FIFA World Cup qualification campaigns. Maatouk, representing Lebanon, starred in the first season alongside Thiago Silva (Brazil), Luka Modrić (Croatia), Pierre-Emerick Aubameyang (Gabon), Andre Blake (Jamaica) and Brian Kaltak (Vanuatu). It was released by Netflix, and also shown on FIFA's own streaming platform, FIFA+.

Career statistics

Club

International

Honours
Ahed
 Lebanese Premier League: 2007–08, 2009–10, 2010–11
 Lebanese FA Cup: 2004–05, 2008–09, 2010–11
 Lebanese Elite Cup: 2008, 2010, 2011
 Lebanese Super Cup: 2008,

Nejmeh
 Lebanese Elite Cup: 2017, 2018

Ansar
 Lebanese Premier League: 2020–21
 Lebanese FA Cup: 2020–21
 Lebanese Super Cup: 2021

Individual
 IFFHS All-time Lebanon Men's Dream Team
 Lebanese Premier League Best Player: 2009–10, 2010–11, 2017–18, 2018–19
 Lebanese Premier League Best Young Player: 2004–05
 Lebanese Premier League Player of the Week: 2007–08, 2009–10
 Lebanese Premier League Team of the Season: 2005–06, 2008–09, 2009–10, 2010–11, 2017–18, 2018–19
 Lebanese Premier League top goalscorer: 2010–11, 2020–21
 Lebanese FA Cup top goalscorer: 2021–22
 Lebanese Elite Cup top goalscorer: 2008, 2019
 Lebanese Premier League top assist provider: 2017–18, 2020–21

Records
 Lebanon all-time top goalscorer: 21 goals (as of 6 February 2022)
 Lebanon all-time appearance holder: 99 appearances (as of 6 February 2022)
 Fujairah all-time top goalscorer: 56 goals

See also
 List of top international men's football goal scorers by country
 List of Lebanon international footballers

Notes

References

External links

 
 
 

1987 births
Living people
People from Nabatieh District
Lebanese footballers
Association football forwards
Association football wingers
Rot-Weiss Essen players
Al Ahed FC players
Ajman Club players
Emirates Club players
Al-Shaab CSC players
Fujairah FC players
Nejmeh SC players
Al Ansar FC players
Lebanese Premier League players
UAE Pro League players
UAE First Division League players
Lebanon youth international footballers
Lebanon international footballers
2019 AFC Asian Cup players
Lebanese expatriate footballers
Lebanese expatriate sportspeople in Germany
Lebanese expatriate sportspeople in the United Arab Emirates
Expatriate footballers in Germany
Expatriate footballers in the United Arab Emirates
Lebanese Premier League top scorers
FIFA Century Club